The current capital of Japan is Tokyo. In the course of history, the national capital has been in many locations other than Tokyo.

History
Traditionally, the home of the Emperor is considered the capital. From 794 through 1868, the Emperor lived in Heian-kyō, modern-day Kyoto. After 1868, the seat of the Government of Japan and the location of the Emperor's home was moved to Edo, which it renamed Tokyo.

Modern law

While no laws have designated Tokyo as the Japanese capital, many laws have defined a  that incorporates Tokyo. This implies that the government has designated Tokyo as the capital of Japan, although (again) it is not explicitly stated, and the definition of the "capital area" is purposely restricted to the terms of that specific law.

This term for capital was never used to refer to Kyoto. Indeed, shuto came into use during the 1860s as a gloss of the English term "capital".

The Ministry of Education published a book called "History of the Restoration" in 1941. A contemporary history textbook states that the Meiji government "moved the capital (shuto) from Kyoto to Tokyo" without using the sento term.

As of 2007, there is a movement to transfer the government functions of the capital from Tokyo while retaining Tokyo as the de facto capital, with the Gifu-Aichi region, the Mie-Kio region and other regions submitting bids for a de jure capital. Officially, the relocation is referred to as "capital functions relocation" instead of "capital relocation", or as "relocation of the Diet and other organizations".

In 2017, the Government of Japan decided to move the Agency for Cultural Affairs to Kyoto.

List of capitals

Legendary
This list of legendary capitals of Japan begins with the reign of Emperor Jimmu. The names of the Imperial palaces are in parentheses:

 Kashihara, Yamato at the foot of Mount Unebi during reign of Emperor Jimmu
 Kazuraki, Yamato during reign of Emperor Suizei
 Katashiha, Kawachi during the reign of Emperor Annei
 Karu, Yamato during reign of Emperor Itoku.
 Waki-no-kami, Yamato during the reign of Emperor Kōshō
 Muro, Yamato during reign of Emperor Kōan
 Kuruda, Yamato during the reign of Emperor Kōrei
 Karu, Yamato during reign of Emperor Kōgen
 Izakaha, Yamato during reign of Emperor Kaika
 Shika, Yamato (Palace of Mizugaki) during reign of Emperor Sujin
 Shika, Yamato (Palace of Tamagaki) during reign of Emperor Suinin 
 Makimuko, Yamato (Palace of Hishiro) during reign of Emperor Keikō
 Shiga, Ōmi (Palace of Takaanaho) during reign of Emperor Seimu
 Ando, Nara (Palace of Toyoura) and Kashiki on the island of Kyushu during reign of Emperor Chūai

Historical
This list of capitals includes the Imperial palaces names in parentheses.

Kofun period
 Karushima, Yamato (Palace of Akira), reign of Emperor Ōjin
 Naniwa, Settsu (Palace of Takatsu), reign of Emperor Nintoku
 Iware, Yamato (Palace of Wakasakura), reign of Emperor Richū
 Tajihi, Kawachi (Palace of Shibakaki), reign of Emperor Hanzei
 Asuka, Yamato (Palace of Tohotsu), reign of Emperor Ingyō
 Isonokami, Yamato (Palace of Anaho), reign of Emperor Ankō
 Sakurai, Nara (Hatsuse no Asakura Palace), 457–479 in reign of Emperor Yūryaku
 Sakurai, Nara (Iware no Mikakuri Palace), 480–484 in reign of Emperor Seinei
 Asuka, Yamato (Chikatsu-Asuka-Yatsuri Palace), 485–487 in reign of Emperor Kenzō
 Tenri, Nara (Isonokami Hirotaka Palace), 488–498 in reign of Emperor Ninken
 Sakurai, Nara (Nimiki Palace), 499–506 in reign of Emperor Buretsu

 Hirakata, Osaka (Kusuba Palace), 507–511
 Kyōtanabe, Kyoto (Tsutsuki Palace), 511–518 in reign of Emperor Keitai
 Nagaoka-kyō (Otokuni Palace), 518–526 in reign of Keitai
 Sakurai, Nara (Iware no Tamaho Palace), 526–532 in reign of Keitai
 Kashihara, Nara (Magari no Kanahashi Palace), 532–535 in reign of Emperor Ankan
 Sakurai, Nara (Hinokuma no Iorino Palace), 535–539 in reign of Emperor Senka

Asuka period
 Asuka, Yamato (Shikishima no Kanasashi Palace), 540–571 in reign of Emperor Kinmei
 Kōryō, Nara (Kudara no Ohi Palace), 572–575 
 Sakurai, Nara (Osata no Sakitama Palace or Osada no Miya), 572–585 in reign of Emperor Bidatsu
 Shiki District, Nara (Iwareikebe no Namitsuki Palace), 585–587 in the reign of Emperor Yōmei
 Shiki District, Nara (Kurahashi no Shibagaki Palace), 587–592 in the reign of Emperor Sushun
 Asuka, Yamato (Toyura Palace or Toyura-no-miya), 593–603 in the reign of Empress Suiko
 Asuka, Yamato (Oharida Palace or Oharida-no-miya), 603–629 in the reign of Suiko
 Asuka, Yamato (Okamoto Palace or Oakmoto-no-miya), 630–636 in the reign of Emperor Jomei
 Kashihara, Nara (Tanaka Palace or Tanaka-no-miya), 636–639
 Kōryō, Nara (Umayasaka Palace or Umayasaka-no-miya, 640
 Kōryō, Nara (Kudara Palace or Kudara-no-miya), 640–642
 Asuka, Yamato (Oharida Palace), 642–643
 Asuka, Yamato (Itabuki Palace or Itabuki no miya), 643–645 in the reign of Empress Kōgyoku
 Osaka (Naniwa Nagara-Toyosaki Palace), 645–654 in the reign of Emperor Kōtoku
 Asuka, Yamato (Itabuki Palace), 655–655 in the reign of Kōtoku
 Asuka, Yamato (Kawahara Palace or Kawahara-no-miya), 655–655
 Asuka, Yamato (Okamoto Palace or Nochi no Asuka-Okamoto-no-miya), 656–660 in the reign of Emperor Saimei
 Asakura, Fukuoka (Asakura no Tachibana no Hironiwa Palace or Asakure no Tachibana no Hironiwa-no-miya), 660–661
 Osaka, (Naniwa Nagara-Toyosaki Palace), 661–667
 Ōtsu, Shiga (Ōmi Ōtsu Palace or Ōmi Ōtsu-no-miya), 667–672 in reign of Emperor Tenji and the reign of Emperor Kōbun
 Asuka, Yamato (Kiyomihara Palace or Kiomihara-no-miya), 672–694 in the reign of Emperor Tenmu and in the reign of Empress Jitō

 Fujiwara-kyō (Fujiwara Palace), 694–710 in the reign of Emperor Monmu

Nara period

 Heijō-kyō (Heijō Palace), 710–740 in the reigns of Empress Genmei, Empress Genshō, and Emperor Shōmu
 Kuni-kyō (Kuni Palace), 740–744 in the reign of Shomu
 Naniwa-kyō, 744
 Naniwa-kyō, Shigaraki Palace, 744–745
 Heijō-kyō (Heijō Palace), 745–784
 Nagaoka-kyō (Nagaoka Palace), 784–794 in the reign of Emperor Kanmu

Heian period

 Heian-kyō (Heian Palace), 794–1180 in the reign of Kammu and others
 Fukuhara Palace, 1180 in the reign of Emperor Antoku

Medieval Japan and Early modern period (see also: History of Japan)
 Heian-kyō or Kyōto (Heian Palace), 1180–1868
 Yoshino (Nanboku-chō period), 1336–1392

Modern Japan (see also: History of Japan)
 Tōkyō (Kōkyo), 1868–present

Historical capitals
Hiraizumi was the capital of totally independent Northern Fujiwara polity (Ōshū) based in Tōhoku region, having defeated Emishi tribes.  This polity existed as Kyoto's internal politics prevented  Kyoto's authority from 1100 to 1189.
 Hakodate was the capital of the short lived Republic of Ezo (1869)
 Shuri was the capital of Ryukyu Kingdom (1429–1879) and Urasoe was capital of Chuzan from at least 1350, which predated the Ryukyu Kingdom.

See also
List of capitals and largest cities by country

References

Further reading
 Fiévé, Nicolas and Paul Waley. (2003). Japanese Capitals in Historical Perspective: Place, Power and Memory in Kyoto, Edo and Tokyo. New York: Psychology Press.

External links

Japan
Japan
 
Geographic history of Japan